Ju Gau-jeng (6 October 1954 – 22 October 2021) was a Taiwanese politician who served in the Legislative Yuan from 1987 to 1999. He was known for his combative personality, and helped found two political parties.

Education
Ju studied law at National Taiwan University and philosophy at Bonn University.

Political career
Ju co-founded the Democratic Progressive Party in 1986, and was responsible for writing the party charter. He was elected to the Legislative Yuan for the first time that year. Shortly after taking office, Ju gained the nickname Rambo for his combative personality, which frequently led to him physically fighting other lawmakers. The first instance of legislative brawling in Taiwan involved Ju, and took place on 7 April 1988, after speaker Liu Kuo-tsai had started counting votes on a budget proposal, which passed. Ju jumped onto the speaker's podium, followed by Jaw Shaw-kong, who was attempting to stop Ju. Throughout the altercation, Liu continued counting votes. Ju ran for election in 1989 without the support of the Democratic Progressive Party, and managed to retain his legislative seat. For mounting an independent campaign, Ju was expelled from the DPP in February 1990 and founded the Chinese Social Democratic Party in 1991. He contested the 1992 legislative elections as a CSDP candidate, which he won. As the only member of his party, Ju chose to caucus with the New Party. By 1993, Ju had again decided to switch affiliations. Though he briefly considered joining the Kuomintang, he was named the New Party candidate for governor of Taiwan Province in August 1994. As a result, Ju consolidated the CSDP with the New Party on 28 December 1994. He lost the gubernatorial election to incumbent James Soong, but subsequently was reelected to parliament as a member of the New Party in 1995. Ju was expelled from the New Party in 1997, and not reelected as an independent candidate in the 1998 legislative election. Ju and Hsu Hsin-liang created the Tangwai round-table forum in February 2003. After his retirement from politics, Ju taught law at Peking University.

Ju died in Taipei on 22 October 2021.

References

1954 births
2021 deaths
Yunlin County Members of the Legislative Yuan
Members of the 1st Legislative Yuan in Taiwan
Members of the 2nd Legislative Yuan
Members of the 3rd Legislative Yuan
New Party Members of the Legislative Yuan
Democratic Progressive Party Members of the Legislative Yuan
National Taiwan University alumni
University of Bonn alumni
Academic staff of Peking University
Expelled members of the Democratic Progressive Party (Taiwan)
Taiwanese political party founders
Kaohsiung Members of the Legislative Yuan
Tainan Members of the Legislative Yuan
Chiayi City Members of the Legislative Yuan
Chiayi County Members of the Legislative Yuan